Osmann Kijamet (born 30 October 1980) is a former Slovenian darts player.

Career

Kijamet won the 2009 PDC East European Qualifying Event, earning him a place in the 2010 PDC World Darts Championship. He was the first Slovenian darts player to qualify for either version of the World Darts Championship. He defeated New Zealand's Phillip Hazel 4–2 in the preliminary round, but was whitewashed 3–0 by Andy Hamilton in the first round. He was invited to represent Slovenia at the World Cup of darts 2010, but he and Sebastijan Pečjak lost to Sweden 2:6. However, Kijamet checked out on 146 - one of highest checkouts in a tournament.

World Championship results

PDC

 2010: 1st Round (lost to Andy Hamilton 0-3)

External links
Profile and stats on Darts Database

Living people
People from Kamnik
Slovenian darts players
Professional Darts Corporation associate players
1980 births
PDC World Cup of Darts Slovenian team